El Puente Municipality may refer to:
 El Puente Municipality, Tarija, Eustaquio Méndez Province, Tarija Department, Bolivia
 El Puente Municipality, Santa Cruz, Guarayos Province, Santa Cruz Department, Bolivia

Municipality name disambiguation pages